These are the official results of the Women's high jump event at the 1994 European Championships in Helsinki, Finland, held at Helsinki Olympic Stadium on 12 and 14 August 1994. There were a total number of 35 participating athletes.

Medalists

Qualification
Held on 12 August 1994

Final

Participation
According to an unofficial count, 35 athletes from 24 countries participated in the event.

 (1)
 (2)
 (1)
 (2)
 (1)
 (1)
 (1)
 (2)
 (1)
 (1)
 (1)
 (1)
 (1)
 (1)
 (2)
 (2)
 (2)
 (1)
 (3)
 (1)
 (1)
 (2)
 (1)
 (3)

See also
 1991 Women's World Championships High Jump (Tokyo)
 1992 Women's Olympic High Jump (Barcelona)
 1993 Women's World Championships High Jump (Stuttgart)
 1995 Women's World Championships High Jump (Gothenburg)
 1996 Women's Olympic High Jump (Atlanta)
 1997 Women's World Championships High Jump (Athens)

References

 Results

High jump
High jump at the European Athletics Championships
1994 in women's athletics